Harry Robert Damrau (September 11, 1890 – August 21, 1957) was an American Major League Baseball third baseman. He played for the Philadelphia Athletics during the  season.

References

External links

1890 births
1957 deaths
Major League Baseball third basemen
Philadelphia Athletics players
Baseball players from New York (state)
Sportspeople from Newburgh, New York
York White Roses players
Lancaster Red Roses players
Lancaster Lanks players
Atlantic City Lanks players
Petersburg Goobers players
Portsmouth Truckers players
Montreal Royals players
Mobile Bears players
Newark Bears (IL) players
Atlanta Crackers players
Jersey City Skeeters players
Springfield Ponies players
Bridgeport Bears (baseball) players
Rocky Mount Broncos players